Grant Lingard (1961–1995) was a New Zealand born artist who, although a painting graduate, focused on minimalist sculptural installations. During his life he "was considered by many to be New Zealand's leading gay visual artist"

Lingard achieved note with the 1994 ARTNOW exhibition at the Museum of New Zealand Te Papa Tongarewa. He was also involved in the Tales Untold project. Lingard focused on creating a visual language over the course of his ten-year career. Lingard used everyday materials recontextualised into a gallery context, hoping make the viewer see the links he was drawing. His work is conceptually similar to Félix González-Torres.

Lingard died in 1995 of AIDS-related complications. A scholarship in his name is offered at the University of Canterbury, Christchurch, New Zealand.

Works
Flags and Boots(1994)
Works by Grant Lingard in the collection of the Museum of New Zealand Te Papa Tongarewa

References

The Grant Lingard Scholarship
Grant Lingard profile at the Christchurch Art Gallery Website

New Zealand artists
1961 births
1995 deaths
University of Canterbury alumni
AIDS-related deaths in New Zealand
People educated at Greymouth High School